Karamaly-Buzat (Qaramalı-Buźat) is a rural locality (a village) in Buzatovsky Selsoviet, Sterlibashevsky District, Bashkortostan, Russia. The population was 10 as of 2010. There are 2 streets.

Geography 
Karamaly-Buzat is located 54 km southwest of Sterlibashevo (the district's administrative centre) by road. Galey-Buzat is the nearest rural locality.

References 

Rural localities in Sterlibashevsky District